Cranmer is an English surname.

Notable people with the surname include:
 Barbara Cranmer (1959/60–2019), Canadian First Nation documentary filmmaker
 Bob Cranmer (born 1956), American politician from Pittsburgh, Pennsylvania
 Craig Cranmer (born 1968), Scottish footballer
 Dave Cranmer (born 1944), Canadian football player
 Doug Cranmer (1927–2006), Canadian carver, artist and First Nation chief
 Emma Amelia Cranmer (1858–1937), American reformer, suffragist, writer
 Kyle Cranmer (born 1977), American particle physicist
 Margarete Cranmer (died c.1571), second wife of Thomas Cranmer  
 Michael Cranmer (born 1989), South Australian cricketer
 Paul Cranmer (born 1969), Canadian football player
 Peter Cranmer (1914–1994), English cricketer and rugby union player
 Philip Cranmer (1918–2006), English teacher of and composer of classical music
 Scotty Cranmer (born 1987), American BMX rider
 Steffen Cranmer (born 1934), British sports shooter
 Thomas Cranmer (1489–1556), leader of the English Reformation and Archbishop of Canterbury during the reigns of Henry VIII and Edward VI

Other notable people:
 Francis Cranmer Penrose (1817–1903), British architect, archaeologist, and astronomer
 Martha Cranmer Oliver (1834–1880), English actress

See also
 Cranmer Bank, area of Moortown, Leeds, England
 Cranmer House (disambiguation)
 Cranmer Park, Denver, Colorado